Arnold Schwellensattl (born 13 January 1975) is an Italian football manager and former footballer who played as a forward.

External links
 

1975 births
Living people
Italian footballers
WSG Tirol players
FC Admira Wacker Mödling players
DSV Leoben players
IK Start players
LASK players
SK Vorwärts Steyr players
TSV 1860 Munich II players
Italian expatriate footballers
Expatriate footballers in Germany
Italian expatriate sportspeople in Germany
Expatriate footballers in China
Italian expatriate sportspeople in China
Expatriate footballers in Norway
Italian expatriate sportspeople in Norway
Eliteserien players
Association football forwards
Germanophone Italian people
Sportspeople from Merano
Footballers from Trentino-Alto Adige/Südtirol